Daniel Allen Winkler (born February 2, 1990) is an American professional baseball pitcher who is a free agent. He previously played in Major League Baseball (MLB) for the Atlanta Braves and Chicago Cubs.

Career
Winkler attended St. Anthony High School in Effingham, Illinois. He then attended Parkland College and was drafted by the Chicago Cubs in the 43rd round of the 2010 Major League Baseball draft, but did not sign and instead transferred to the University of Central Florida (UCF). In 2011, his junior season, he went 3-4 with a 4.70 ERA in 18 games.

Colorado Rockies
Winkler was then drafted by the Colorado Rockies in the 20th round of the 2011 Major League Baseball draft and signed.

Winkler made his professional debut for the Casper Ghosts, going 4–3 in 12 starts with a 3.92 earned run average (ERA) and 65 strikeouts over  innings. He spent the 2012 season with the Asheville Tourists. He started 25 games, going 11–10 with a 4.46 ERA and 136 strikeouts in  innings. Winkler started the 2013 season with the Modesto Nuts. On June 25, 2013 he combined with two relievers to pitch a no-hitter. He was promoted to the Tulsa Drillers near the end of the season. Overall, he was 13–7 with a 2.98 ERA and 175 strikeouts in 157 innings. The 175 strikeouts led all minor league players. He returned to Tulsa to start the 2014 season. He underwent Tommy John surgery to repair the ulnar collateral ligament of the elbow in June 2014.

Atlanta Braves
On December 11, 2014, the Atlanta Braves selected Winkler during the Rule 5 Draft. He was activated from the disabled list in September 2015. Winkler debuted on September 21, striking out two of the three New York Mets batters he faced.

Winkler fractured his elbow on April 10, 2016, while facing the St. Louis Cardinals outfielder Randal Grichuk. He missed the remainder of the 2016 season, and as a result, resolved to adjust his mechanics to lessen stress on his elbow. Winkler was reactivated in August 2017, but due to injury had not yet fulfilled the major league service time requirement mandated of Rule 5 draftees. In January 2018, the Braves signed Winkler to a one-year contract worth $610,000. For the 2018 season, Winkler posted an ERA of 3.43 in 69 games. He struck out 69 in  innings.

San Francisco Giants
On July 31, 2019, Winkler was traded to the San Francisco Giants along with Tristan Beck in exchange for Mark Melancon. He was designated for assignment the next day. He became a free agent after the season.

Chicago Cubs
On December 6, 2019, Winkler signed a split major league contract worth $750,000 with the Chicago Cubs. In 2020 for Chicago, Winkler pitched to a 2.95 ERA with 18 strikeouts in 18.1 innings pitched across 18 appearances.

In 47 games in 2021 for the Cubs, Winkler posted a 5.22 ERA with 40 strikeouts. On August 17, 2021, Winkler was designated for assignment by the Cubs. On August 20, Winkler was released by the Cubs.

Texas Rangers
On March 14, 2022, Winkler signed a minor league deal with the Texas Rangers. He opted out of his deal and became a free agent on June 1, 2022.

Chicago White Sox
On June 16, 2022, Winkler signed a minor league deal with the Chicago White Sox. He elected free agency on November 10, 2022.

References

External links

1990 births
Living people
People from Effingham, Illinois
Baseball players from Illinois
Major League Baseball pitchers
Atlanta Braves players
Chicago Cubs players
Parkland Cobras baseball players
UCF Knights baseball players
Casper Ghosts players
Asheville Tourists players
Modesto Nuts players
Tulsa Drillers players
Peoria Javelinas players
Rome Braves players
Florida Fire Frogs players
Gwinnett Braves players
Gwinnett Stripers players
Sacramento River Cats players
Round Rock Express players
Rochester Honkers players